Pakdam Pakdai, also known as Rat-A-Tat is an Indian Flash-animated comedy television series, formerly on Nickelodeon India and currently airing on Sonic Nickelodeon. The series is an adaptation of the 1998 French animated series, Oggy and the Cockroaches (although both shows are inspired from William Hanna and Joseph Barbera's Tom and Jerry) by Jean-Yves Raimbaud and Xilam, likely due to licensing issues and the show's immense popularity in India.

The show began airing on 27 May 2013. It now telecasts 585 episodes on Sonic Nickelodeon. Some aspects of the series are based on several Indian dubs of Oggy and the Cockroaches, which added dialogue parodying Bollywood actors and filmmakers including a narrator (unlike the French series' German dub) based on Nana Patekar, some of which even localized character names. Pakdam Pakdai is narrated by Nana, the eponymous narrator. Worldwide releases of the show, however, omit these in favor of silent comedy.

Synopsis
Doggy Don (Don) is an anthropomorphic little pink dog, who resides in the modern suburbs of an unspecified location somewhere in South India. Unfortunately, he shares his house with three troublemaking mice: Chhotu (Charly), Lambu (Larry) and Motu (Marly), dubbed the "Chuha Party" (""). Don is usually accompanied by his older brother, Karnal (Colonel), who has a stronger grudge against the mice with his shorter temper, and Rox (Ballu), a cranky and aggressive Great Dane, who is Don's neighbor.

Every episode in the series circulates around some type of chaos that the mice produce and the havoc that ensues as the dogs attempt to stop the situation from escalating further, only to either make things worse or take the blame for the mice's shenanigans. Ranging from stealing food to framing others for their own misdeeds and even hijacking vehicles to go on joyrides, the mice will go to any length possible to wreak havoc and irritate the people around them and escalate their situations to extremely outrageous heights, usually, but not exclusively the dogs. All of the main characters are based on the cast in Oggy and the Cockroaches' first three seasons, in various original and occasionally absurd stories.

Characters
The mice were named after the localized names of Joey, Dee Dee and Marky for one Indian dub of its inspiration. Their names were localized in English-language releases, with the exception of Don, whose name was simply shortened.

Main
 Doggy Don (Don) is a pink dog, who is usually irritated by the mice. His days are nearly always ruined by them in some way - therefore, he always plans to get revenge on them by retaliating in a multitude of different ways, and rarely succeeds. In spite of his luck, he is quite intelligent and can quickly solve his way out of a situation if the mice don't interfere (and they rarely don't). His catchphrase is "Don se bachna mushkil hi nahi, naa mumkin hai" (It is not only difficult to escape from Don, it is not possible either). Don lives in a house with his elder brother, the three mice, and later Thaw. His house has a built-in laboratory, which he occasionally uses to conspire plans against the mice. In the Hindi version, his dialogue is based on Shah Rukh Khan's characters. He is based on Oggy.
 The Mice
 Chhotu (Charly) is the leader of the Chuha Party and is the oldest out of all of them. He has yellow fur, brown hair, and wears spectacles. Chhotu is funny, hyperactive, and impish for pranking Don with his group. He's also the most ingenious for coming up with ideas on situations or methods. Despite this, he has himself defeated of others, which frequently leads to his defeat at the hands of the dogs and sometimes his own friends. In the Hindi version, his dialogue is based on Paresh Rawal's characters. He is based on Joey.
 Lambu (Larry) is a purple mouse, with black hair, and the middle child of the group. He is described as cool, laid-back and chill compared to the others, but still doesn't shy away from having fun with his friends and generally wreaking havoc. He is quite the jokester and he likes to hang around with others. His catchphrase is "Don't make me angry". In the Hindi version, his dialogue is based on Akshay Kumar's characters. He is based on Marky.
 Motu (Marly) is the youngest of the Chuha Party. He is a grayish blue mouse. As the glutton of the organization, he is fixated on food most of the time, which drives his group nuts. In the Hindi version, his dialogue is based on Suniel Shetty's characters. He is based on Dee Dee.
Karnal – (Colonel) is the overprotective, aggressive and occasionally arrogant older brother of Don. He is a muscular green dog with a soldier's hat (as he was a former soldier), tags, and white gloves. He almost always helps Don for dealing with the mice's shenanigans. He's quite strong compared to the others. In the Hindi version, his dialogue is based on Sunny Deol's characters. He is based on Jack.

Recurring 
 Thaw (Major Saab Jr.) is Don and Karnal's friend, who is also a dog. The brothers adopted him when Thaw's father, who was part of the Air Force, was killed in a helicopter accident. He is younger in age and smaller in size compared to both Don and Karnal. He is often seen hanging out with Don and Karnal and competing against the mice. He seems to be quite a gourmand, and will usually tend to eat everything in the refrigerator for a single meal. In the Hindi version, his dialogue is based on Saif Ali Khan's characters. He is likely based on Dee Dee, as Motu is.
 Rox (Ballu) is a cranky, easily angered muscular looking Great Dane that lives in the house next door. A running gag of the show shows Don, Karnal or the mice doing something which aggravates him or causes him to suffer in a situation, and as punishment, he'll pummel them in various fashions, either onscreen or offscreen. He and Karnal are of the same age, and are sometimes shown to be friends. In the Hindi version, his dialogue is based on  Amrish Puri's characters. He is based on Bob.
 Doctor – He is the family pediatrician of the dog brothers, the mice, as well as Ballu. He is shown to be attending in an army camp, police station and the school Don and Karnal enrolled in, as seen in a flashback episode. He is foolish as he frequently gets caught in the chaos of the mice. He is likely based on the Doctor character from Oggy and the Cockroaches.
 Nana (the Narrator) – He is, as his nickname implies, the narrator of the show. He provides commentary during an episode, although he, as well as other instances of dialogue are absent in international versions. In the Hindi version, his dialogue is based on Nana Patekar's characters, and Nana Patekar might be his namesake.

Minor
 Sammy – Sammy is a squirrel who lives in a tree. The problem is that he often plays various mean-spirited pranks on people and calls them names. At one point, he has been diagnosed with Antisocial Personality Disorder, and this only increases his malevolent urge. He is not content unless he is ruining someone's day. However, Sammy has sometimes been punished by his father, something which doesn't stop him. He also hates it when people tell him no one cares what he thinks, and is always determined to prove them wrong. Sammy Squirrel is a character who appeared made his debut in the Pakdam Pakdai episode “A Rodent Fix”, stealing food from Don's garden and later his house. Sammy repeatedly framed Chhotu for stealing carrots, but when Motu and Lambu found out about this and tell Don, they team up to defeat him. The squirrel then proceeds to wreck and eventually destroy the entire house and gets away with it, forcing Don and the mice to move out. However, they are back living in the house in subsequent episodes, presumably due to the show's negative continuity. He later makes a cameo in "Supermarket Don", when he got flattened accidentally by Don in a mascot suit while purchasing a lollypop, as Don had previously been demoted by Rox following the mice wreaking havoc in the store and him getting framed repeatedly for the chaos. He makes a cameo in “Garbage Story”, he people away from smell of the town, blown up and explodes garbage mess of the town.

 Meow (Betty) – She is a labrador retriever who is Doggy Don's love interest. She often goes on dates with Don, but sometimes she is fickle with him. She especially dislikes it when someone or something ruins her date. Meow is often the voice of reason for other characters, including Rox. She debuts in "The Date" (the third episode of the first season), where the mice sneak into the restaurant of which Don and Meow are having their date night and cause trouble, causing her to blame Don for their mischief. She makes a few more cameos as a background character, where she no longer seems to be romantically interested in Don, instead seeing him more as a nuisance and a pest, presumably because the episode ends with her thrashing him violently offscreen after his final attempt at apologizing backfires, with the ring he presents to her being a stick of dynamite laced by the mice. The mice then sneak out of the restaurant and back home scot-free, each carrying a piece of food they had also stolen, while Meow subjects Don to the aforementioned beating. It's heavily indicated that she has since broken up with and has cut all contact with him, as a later episode depicts her with a new suitor: a crocodile (possibly Super-Croc). She is likely based on Olivia.
 Super-Croc (The Terminator) – He is a mugger crocodile wearing a blue shirt and a character who made his debut in the 45th episode of the second season. He can also be spotted in the movie Doggy Don in Egypt (2018), albeit without any clothes. He is mockingly called "stingy" by Don.

Broadcast

Movies
The series has 5 feature-length films, all of which have been released direct-to-television.

1. Pakdam Pakdai Doggy Don vs Billiman (December 19, 2014) - Doggy Don and Karnal take a trip to the future and befriend a cat named Billiman, who turns out to be a villain in a facade and conquers the city. They, along with Chhotu, Motu, Lambu and the residents of the town team up to defeat Billiman together.

2. Pakdam Pakdai Ocean Attack (November 20, 2015) - Doggy Don, Karnal and their brother, Major Saab along with the mice are urged to save the world from an evil shark, called Surmai Bhopali, who destines to transform the world into an ocean only resided by sea creatures by the destroying the balance between sea and land, which is located at the heart of the ocean. Along with their new friends, Boodhababa, Manumaan and Yeti, they defeat Surmai and successfully capture him and his fish army in a jail.

3. Pakdam Pakdai: Doggy Don in Egypt (January 21, 2018) - Doggy Don, Karnal, the mice brothers and an Egyptian cousin of Don work together to defeat an evil magician called Hairis who wants to take over the world.

4. Pakdam Pakdai Space Attack (May 13, 2018) - Doggy Don, Karnal and the mice brothers try to save the world from an alien monkey named Hyper Bunder. The film also marks the debut of two new protagonists - Doggy Dona and Master Goati.

5. Pakdam Pakdai Attack on Tokyo (December 16, 2018)

Awards 
The show is a coproduction between Nickelodeon and was launched in May 2013. It won the "Best Animated TV Episode" award at the 2014 BAF Awards, organised by FICCI, for the episode "Safari Don".

See also
 List of Indian animated television series
 Oggy and the Cockroaches
 Tom and Jerry

References

External links
 Rat-a-Tat - Toonz India's website

Indian children's animated adventure television series
Indian children's animated comedy television series
Hindi-language Nickelodeon original programming
Animated television series about dogs
Animated television series about mice and rats
Animated television series without speech
2013 Indian television series debuts
2013 television series debuts